The Men's individual recurve event at the 2010 South American Games was held on March 23, beginning at 9:30 and ending at 12:30, with the main final.

Medalists

Results

Finals

Top Half

Bottom Half

References
Report

Individual Recurve Men